West Perth is an inner suburb of Perth, the capital city of Western Australia.

Geography

Formerly an exclusive enclave for wealthy merchants and politicians, the West Perth suburb is now part of the inner mixed zone, and has predominantly office blocks which have displaced residential buildings.

The suburb has a relatively high proportion of miners, consultants, and especially medical specialists as compared with the Perth CBD. Streets such as Colin Street, Ord Street, and Outram Street have a significant percentage of office and high density residential buildings.

Most retail outlets are located on Hay Street, which is the main commercial zone for the suburb, and these are focused on serving the office population.

Closer to the CBD, the eastern edge of the suburb features both the Watertown brand outlet complex and the City West complex. This location was home to the Perth Metropolitan Markets from 1929 to 1989, when they moved to Canning Vale.

Livability
In 2018, West Perth was named as the best place to live in the world by international analytics company SAS.

Notable buildings
Parliament House is located overlooking St Georges Terrace and Mitchell Freeway, and is at the centre of the Parliament precinct. Also in the precinct is Dumas House, the original Perth Observatory, the second location of Hale School, Solidarity Park, Edith Dircksey Cowan Memorial, and the Constitutional Centre of Western Australia.

See also

 Greater Perth
 List of Perth suburbs
 Perth metropolitan region

References

External links
 West Perth business map

 

Suburbs in the City of Vincent
Suburbs of Perth, Western Australia